The 2018 Arab League Summit (also known as the Dhahran Summit or Dammam Summit or Jerusalem summit) was the Arab League's 29th summit held in Dhahran, Saudi Arabia on Sunday, 15 April 2018. The Summit was initially expected to be held in Riyadh. A preparatory meeting was held in Riyadh on Thursday, 12 April 2018 which was presided over by the Saudi Minister of Foreign Affairs Adel al-Jubeir. Foreign Ministers of the 22 countries attended the meeting.

Attendance

Arab League representatives
 - Ismail Omar Guelleh
 - President Abdel Fattah el-Sisi
 - President Fuad Masum
 - President Michel Aoun
 - Mohamed Ould Abdel Aziz
 - King Mohammed VI
 - Mahmoud Abbas
 - King Salman
 - Mohamed Abdullahi Mohamed
 - President Omar al-Bashir
 - Beji Caid Essebsi
 - Abdrabbuh Mansur Hadi

Other participants
 African Union Commission - Chairman of the African Union Commission Moussa Faki
 - High Representative of the European Union for Foreign Affairs and Security Policy Federica Mogherini
 - Secretary-General António Guterres

Venue
The summit was announced to be held at the King Abdulaziz Center for World Culture which was constructed by Saudi Aramco and was opened in 2016.

Security Measures
As a security measure a number of roads were closed for traffic in the Dammam-Dhahran-Khobar region. It was also declared that all educational institutions would remain closed on Sunday.

Invitation to Qatar
Despite the blockade imposed on Qatar by Saudi Arabia and a number of other countries, an official invitation was sent to Qatar to attend the Summit. The Foreign Ministry of Qatar issued a statement that Qatar had accepted the invitation and would be attending the Summit. The Saudi Foreign Minister al-Jubeir announced that the Qatar diplomatic crisis would not be discussed at the Summit.

References

2018 Arab League summit
21st-century diplomatic conferences (MENA)
2018 in international relations
2018 conferences
April 2018 events in Asia
2018 in Saudi Arabia
Dammam
April 2018 events in Saudi Arabia